Fort Saint Rocco, also known as Fort Saint Roca on some maps, is a polygonal fort in Kalkara, Malta. It is located east of Rinella Battery and seaward of the village of Santu Rokku, and forms part of the complex of shore batteries built by the British to defend the coast east of the mouth of Grand Harbour between the 1870s and 1900s.

History
The construction of Fort Saint Rocco started in 1872 or 1873 by the British, as part of a programme of improvements to Malta's fortifications recommended in Colonel Jervois' Report of 1866.

The fort was built on the site of San Rocco Battery, an artillery battery built by Maltese insurgents during the blockade of 1798–1800.

Fort Saint Rocco was the first polygonal fort built by the British in Malta, and the second one built in Malta overall (the first was Fort Tigné built by the Order of Saint John). The first fort, built between 1872 and 1873, was very small given the importance of the site. It was initially armed with three RML 11 inch 25 ton guns, but these were soon replaced with RML 12.5 inch 38 ton guns.

In 1888, the fort was inspected and was described as cramped, and some alterations were proposed. Eventually, the keep and most of the battery were demolished, and a much larger fort was built in its place in 1900. The new fort was armed with BL 9.2 inch guns.

On 17 May 1942, the fort fired at attacking Italian E-boats and destroyed one of them. The fort remained a functional military establishment until the 1950s.

Present day
The fort is located close to SmartCity Malta, a technology park. Care has been taken not to damage the fort during the construction of the new complex. The public is forbidden from entering the fort.

In May 2015, several NGOs suggested that the campus of the proposed American University of Malta should be split up between Fort Saint Rocco and the nearby Fort Ricasoli and Fort San Salvatore. This proposal was not implemented, and the campus was built between Dock No. 1 in Cospicua and Żonqor Point in Marsaskala.

References

Saint Rocco
Military installations established in 1873
Military installations established in 1900
Kalkara
Saint Rocco
World War II sites in Malta
Limestone buildings in Malta
Military installations closed in the 1950s
19th-century fortifications
1873 establishments in Malta